Deadwood is a board game for 3-8 players produced by Cheapass Games. In it, players assume the roles of bit actors working for a B-Movie Studio who try to make as much money as possible. This is done by taking on roles such as "man on fire," "woman in black dress," and "falls off roof." Players are represented by dice, which denote what "level" actor each player is. The original version of the game was available through various game outlets. The rules, boards, and cards for a revised edition (Deadwood 2.0) are now available for free download from the company's website, and are being developed into a deluxe edition via Kickstarter.

Overall Gameplay
All players begin each "day" of gameplay at the Trailers located at one corner of the board. In the original game, each player's die begins on 2, denoting they are a "Rank 2 actor". In Version 2.0, players normally start at Rank 1 and play is for 4 "days". Changes are as follows depending on how many are playing:
 With 2 or 3 players, play is for 3 "days".
 With 4 players, there is no change.
 With 5 players, each player also starts with 2 "credits".
 With 6 players, each player also starts with 4 "credits".
 With 7 or 8 players, each player starts at Rank 2.

Players can raise their rank by taking roles and earning both money and "screen credits". Each "day", 10 different "scene cards"—each dealt to one of 10 "set" spaces on the gameboard—are available in which the actors can participate. Besides the scenes depicted on the "scene card", each set has one or more "set roles" depicted on the space itself. Scenes on the space, but not on the card, are "Scale roles", paying $1 per turn until they are completed. Scenes "on the card" are paid only when the scene ends, but may yield higher paydays. (Multiple players may each take a role on any given scene, even if it is already underway.) In the original game, players can only take roles equal to their rank; if they want to take a lower-ranked role, they must surrender any ranks in between to become an extra of that rank. In Version 2, players can take roles equal to or lower than their rank with no penalty.

Each "scene card" shows between one and three "featured roles" and the "budget" for the project (between $2 million and $6 million). Players who take any role on the set roll one die to determine if the scene progresses, or needs to be reshot. A scene progresses if the number rolled on the die is equal to or higher than the "budget" number on the card (e.g. a $4 million card requires a roll of 4 or more to progress). Most scenes require 2 "shots" to complete, although some may need only one shot to finish, or as many as three shots to complete. When a "Scale" ("Off the card") player rolls to advance a scene, they earn $1 regardless if the roll is successful or not. ("On the card" or "Featured" players earn no money for scene rolls).

In Version 2.0, instead of making a scene roll, a player can opt to "rehearse" the scene. This earns the player a "practice chip" which adds 1 to each further scene roll attempt for that scene only. (Players can earn multiple "practice chips", up one less than the "budget" of the film; i.e. up to 3 chips on a $4 "Million" scene.)

Once all the shots are finished on a scene, the scene "wraps". In the original game, all the "Scale" players earn $1 at this point, and a number of dice equal to the "budget" number are rolled to see what the "Featured" players get paid. Also, the player whose scene roll completes the shoot earns the "screen credit" for the scene; a full credit if they were "on the card", or a half credit if they were a "Scale" player. In addition, if a "Scale" player earns the credit, they "steal the scene", and all "featured" players "on the card" lose one level for being "upstaged". In Version 2.0, players earn credits for advancing the scene (1 credit plus the usual $1 for "Scale" players, 2 credits for "Featured"). When the scene wraps, if there is at least one "Featured" player on the card, the "Scale" players earn a cash bonus equal to the rank of the role they are on (i.e. a Rank-2 role earns a $2 cash bonus) and the dice are rolled as above for "Featured" players. There is no penalty to "Featured" players if a "Scale" player completes the scene. Players must also surrender any "practice chips" earned for the scene (they do not carry over to other scenes).

Players can use their credits and earnings to "upgrade" their status by moving to the Casting Office. There, players can turn in credits and/or moneyfor each level they wish to go up. In the original game, players pay one screen credit and $2 per level for the new level they arrive at. (EXAMPLE: A Rank 3 player has 2 screen credits. They can exchange 1 credit and $8 to rise to Rank 4, or both credits and $10 to reach Rank 5.) In Version 2.0, players can spend either earned cash OR screen credits to advance their rank. Said advancements are on a new sliding scale, where it takes fewer screen credits than dollars to advance, but players must pay the full amounts to advance regardless of their current rank. (EXAMPLE: It takes $18 or 15 Credits to advance to Rank 4, regardless of what lower rank you hold or what intervening ranks you may have purchased earlier.)

A "day's" play continues until there is only one scene left, the "dog of the day". This scene shuts down before it wraps. In the original game, any players "acting" in it lose a level for not being able to finish it. Players then rearrange their playing order from lowest to highest (as compared by level, then credits still in their hand, then money earned). The lowest player starts the next "day's" play. In Version 2.0, there is no penalty for being on the last scene, and play continues in the same order, with the player who would have been next on the previous day starting the next day (i.e. In a 3-player game, if Player 2 wrapped the last scene, Player 3 starts the next day; if Player 3 wrapped the last day, Player 1 starts the next day; etc.).

After four "days" of play (using all 40 scene cards), the game is over. (In Version 2.0, only 3 "days" are played if playing with only 2 or 3 players.) In the original game, player with the most money wins. If there is a tie, the highest ranked of the tied players wins. If STILL tied, the tied player with the most remaining screen credits wins. In Version 2.0, players total their unspent cash & credits (at 1 point each) and get a bonus of 5 points for each Level they are at game's end (i.e. 5 points for level 1, 10 for level 2, up to 30 for level 6). The player with the most points wins. (If players tie for highest score, they share the win.)

Expansions

Another Day, Another Dollar
Several expansion card decks (called Another Day, Another Dollar) have been made, allowing the players to act in horror films, musicals, science fiction features and kung fu movies. These 14-card expansion decks add 10 new scenes in the given genre (some with up to FOUR available roles), and four "Special Effects" to the game, making for longer, more varied and more complex gameplay. The scene cards are compatible with both versions of the game, but the Special Effects will only work with the original game.

DEADWOOD: On Location
Another expansion, DEADWOOD: On Location, adds a new set of six unconnected gameboards representing "location shoots" the players are now trying to get on (these boards are used in place of the original gameboard; the same base game cards are used, as can be any of the expansion card sets). Players get TWO moves per turn, which include using Bus Stops to move from location to location. Each Bus Stop has three dice on it, which relate to the locations to which the Bus Stop "connects". The player rolls three dice. If any of the rolled dice matches one of the numbers on the Bus Stop, the player can move to the connecting Bus Stop (the Bus Stop featuring the number of the location where you started) at that numbered location without it counting as a move. (NOTE: With its various rules changes, Version 2.0 is incompatible with "On Location".)

Deadwood Studios USA
On March 1, 2013, Cheapass Games began a Kickstarter project to produce a "deluxe" edition of the Version 2.0 game, titled "Deadwood Studios USA". Unlike other Cheapass Games' products where you have to supply your own game pieces (dice, markers, play money, etc.), this deluxe boxed game would include all the components needed to play straight out of the box. The project's donation window was open until April 2, with a goal of $35,000 to be able to produce the game. As of March 10, 2013, the project had 374 backers and over $20,000 of the goal achieved.

The Kickstarter succeeded and the product has now shipped to backers.

Reception
The reviewer from the online second volume of Pyramid stated that "If you're already familiar with the games of James Ernest and his Cheapass friends, you probably don't need any convincing to get you to buy this game. If you haven't played their games before, Deadwood will make a great introduction to the company's knack for creative game mechanics, elegant simulations of "real-life" situations, and quirky humor."

References

External links
Deadwood product page at Cheapass Games

Board games introduced in 1999
Cheapass Games games